Ali Hassan Al-Thani is a Bahraini footballer who played at 2007 AFC Asian Cup.

References

Living people
Bahraini footballers
Bahrain international footballers
Place of birth missing (living people)
Association football goalkeepers
1972 births
Footballers at the 1994 Asian Games
Asian Games competitors for Bahrain